Not Just Stories is the debut extended play by American contemporary worship musician Maryanne J. George. The EP was released on October 8, 2021, via Tribl Records. The EP contains guest appearances by Mitch Wong, Naomi Raine, Dante Bowe, Justus Tams, and Aaron Moses. Austin Davis handled the production of the EP.

Not Just Stories debuted at number twelve on Billboards Top Christian Albums Chart and number three on Top Gospel Albums Chart.

Background
In September 2021, Tribl Records announced that they will be releasing Not Just Stories, the debut extended play by Maryanne J. George, on October 8, 2021. The EP featured collaborations with fellow Maverick City Music artists Dante Bowe, Naomi Raine, and Aaron Moses, with additional features from Mitch Wong and Justus Tams.

Maryanne J. George spoke of the album in an interview, saying:

Release and promotion
On September 17, 2021, Maryanne J. George released "Not Just Stories" featuring Aaron Moses as the first and only promotional single from the EP.

Commercial performance
Not Just Stories debuted at debuted at number twelve on the Top Christian Albums Chart and number three on the Top Gospel Albums Chart published by Billboard in the United States having sold 3,000 equivalent album units.

Track listing

Charts

Weekly charts

Year-end charts

Release history

References

External links
 

2021 EPs